Macrocallista nimbosa, or the sunray venus clam, is a species of bivalve mollusc in the family Veneridae.

Description
Adult size ranges from 65 mm. to 90 mm.

Distribution
Atlantic coast of North America, ranging from North Carolina to Texas.

References

Veneridae
Molluscs described in 1786